Golepur (Urdu: گولپور) is a village and union council of Jhelum District in the Punjab Province of Pakistan. A facility comprising ticket office, platforms, etc. for loading and unloading train passengers and freight.

It is part of Tehsil Pind Dadan Khan.

Villages in union council 
Golepur Union Council is subdivided into 10 villages:
 Chan Pur
 Choran
 Dandot RS Dalmian
 Dhoke Vaince
 Golepur
 Hattar Jhelum
 Kora
 Pither Kalan
 Pither Nadi
 Sihotra

See also 
Golepur railway station

References

Villages in Union Council Golepur
Union councils of Pind Dadan Khan Tehsil
Populated places in Tehsil Pind Dadan Khan
Pind Dadan Khan Tehsil